Denise Roberts (born in Glasgow, Scotland), is an Australian actress and director who has worked in theatre, film and television since 1980. She gained initial fame when she played Julie Winters in the ABC-TV medical drama G.P. from 1989 to 1996. Roberts's mentor was Hayes Gordon, with whom she studied solidly for three years. During her seven-year stint on G.P., she taught film and television for Hayes at his Ensemble Studios.

In 2009 Roberts played the recurring role of Bonnie Bright in Channel 7's Packed To The Rafters and Faye on the feature film Subdivision which premiered in August 2009.

Roberts played Helen Jones in Joanne Lees: Murder in the Outback, and starred as Aunty Barbara in the feature film Razzle Dazzle. She is best known for her starring roles as the University Registrar Jessica Andrews in Roberts 7's HeadLand and the town matriarch Isabelle Turnbull in Always Greener, and for her seven years as Julie Winters in G.P. on ABC-TV. In 2010, she played Inspector Diane Pappas in the Nine Network police drama Cops L.A.C.

Writer
Author of the popular Actor's Advisory Manual, Get Your Act Together, published by the Federation Press in 1995, Roberts has also directed numerous theatre plays, including Lovers At Versailles at the Playhouse - Sydney Opera House. The 10-minute 16 mm short thriller Stairwell, which Roberts directed, was screened at the LA International Short Film Festival. She is the creator and Associate Producer of the ABC's 10-part drama series, Correlli, which gave Hugh Jackman his big Australian break.

Awards

Roberts has received accolades at every stage of her career. She was nominated for Best Actress in a Leading Role by the Sydney Theatre Critics for her role in the highly successful David Williamson play A Charitable Intent. Other nominations and awards include a Chief Glugs Award for Excellence Behind the Scenes, an AFI Award, a Variety Club of Australia Award for Best Actress in a Television Drama, numerous Silver Logie and People's Choice Nominations for Most Outstanding Actress on Australian Television, and a Film Critics Circle Nomination for Best Supporting Actress alongside Cate Blanchett and Frances O'Connor. In 2015 Roberts was nominated for an AACTA AFI Award for Best Guest or Supporting Actress in a Television Drama together with a Silver Logie for Most Outstanding Actress in a Television Drama, both for her portrayal as Rosleigh Rose Corby in Schapelle.

Teacher
Roberts is the founder and Principal Director of Screenwise, a Sydney-based film and television school for actors.

Filmography

Film

Television

References

External links 

 Screenwise - Australia's Leading Film & TV School for Actors

AACTA Award winners
Australian film actresses
Australian corporate directors
Living people
Year of birth missing (living people)
Australian television actresses